This includes a list of airports in Maharashtra, India, including commercially used airfields, former airfields, flying schools and military bases. This list contains the following information:
City served – The city generally associated with the airport is not always the actual location since some airports are located in smaller towns outside the city they serve.
ICAO – The location indicator assigned by the International Civil Aviation Organization (ICAO).
IATA – The airport code assigned by the International Air Transport Association (IATA).
Operator – Operator of the airport. AAI, HAL, GVK, MIDC, MADC and Reliance operate airports in Maharashtra.
Role – Role of the airport as given by the table below. An airport may play more than one role.

There are 10 civilian airports operational:
7 - regional, domestic.

3 - regional, domestic, international.

Chhatrapati Shivaji Maharaj International Airport in Mumbai is the state's busiest and country's second busiest airport, followed by Pune Airport

List

References 

 

Maharashtra
 
Airports